Karla Šabašov (born 15 March 2003) is a Croatian footballer who plays as a midfielder for Women's First League club ŽNK Split and the Croatia women's national team.

Club career
Šabašov has played for Split in Croatia.

International career
Šabašov capped for Croatia at senior level during the UEFA Women's Euro 2022 qualifying.

References

2003 births
Living people
Croatian women's footballers
Women's association football midfielders
ŽNK Split players
Croatia women's international footballers